The Juno Award for Electronic Album of the Year is an annual award presented by the Canadian Academy of Recording Arts and Sciences for the best electronic album released in Canada. It has been awarded since 2011. The five nominees and eventual winner in the category are chosen by a panel of judges from the music industry across Canada.

Recipients

References

Electronic album
J
Album awards